Gnathophyma involves swelling of the chin. It is a type of lesion associated with rosacea, a common chronic inflammatory skin disorder of the sebaceous (oily and fatty) glands characterized by redness, swelling, and acne-like pustules. 

Other lesions associated with rosacea, which affects about 10 percent of fair-skinned people normally between the ages of 30 and 50, include:
 Rhinophyma (enlarged nose)
 Metophyma (enlarged cushion-like swelling of the forehead)
 Blepharophyma (swelling of the eyelids)
 Otophyma (a cauliflower-like swelling of the earlobes)

Treatment for mild to moderate cases includes an oral antibiotic or topical gel or cream.

See also
 List of cutaneous conditions
 Phymas in rosacea

References

Acneiform eruptions